Now and Then, Amen is a 1988 novel from Australian author Jon Cleary. It was the fifth book featuring Sydney homicide detective Scobie Malone. There were plans to adapt the book into a mini-series, but this ended up not happening.

Synopsis
Malone investigates the death of a nun found outside a brothel. She turns out to be the granddaughter of a rich Australian businessman who is determined to see his son become Australia's first Pope. The story explores Sydney in the wake of the 1987 stock market crash.

References

External links
Now and Then, Amen at AustLit (subscription required)

1988 Australian novels
Novels set in Sydney
Novels by Jon Cleary